Lake Lauricocha (possibly from Huánuco Quechua lawri bluish, Quechua qucha lake, lagoon, "bluish lake") is a lake in the Andes mountains of central Peru, within Huánuco Region.

Geography
He identified Lake Lauricocha as the source of the Amazon. Several additional places have since been proposed as sources of the Amazon.

The Lauricocha River flows out of the lake. A hamlet also called Lauricocha is near the outlet of the lake. A stone bridge dating from the Inca Empire crosses the river. The bridge is part of the Qhapac nan, the Inca road system, which passed here enroute from Cuzco to Quito in present-day Ecuador.  Overlooking the lake is Lauricocha cave, an archaeological site with evidence of human beings residing there 12,000 years ago.

Ecology 
The predominant species of fish in the lake is the introduced rainbow trout. Among the fauna present around the lake are birds like ducks, tinamous and hawks; and mammals like tarucas, vizcachas, foxes and skunks.

References 

Lauricocha
Lauricocha
Upper Amazon